Kars/Jenkins Cove Water Aerodrome  is located in Jenkins Bay  east southeast of Kars, New Brunswick, Canada.

References

Registered aerodromes in New Brunswick
Seaplane bases in New Brunswick
Transport in Kings County, New Brunswick